In the field of number theory, the Brun sieve (also called Brun's pure sieve) is a technique for estimating the size of "sifted sets" of positive integers which satisfy a set of conditions which are expressed by congruences.  It was developed by Viggo Brun in 1915 and later generalized to the fundamental lemma of sieve theory by others.

Description
In terms of sieve theory the Brun sieve is of combinatorial type; that is, it derives from a careful use of the inclusion–exclusion principle.

Let  be a finite set of positive integers. 
Let  be some set of prime numbers.  
Finally, define  to be  itself.  
Let  be an arbitrary positive real number. 
The object of the sieve is to estimate:

where the notation  denotes the cardinality of a set , which in this case is just its number of elements. 
Suppose in addition that  may be estimated by

Let

Brun's pure sieve
This formulation is from Cojocaru & Murty, Theorem 6.1.2. With the notation as above, suppose that 
There exist constants  such that, for any positive real number , 

Then

Applications
 Brun's theorem: the sum of the reciprocals of the twin primes converges;
 Schnirelmann's theorem: every even number is a sum of at most  primes (where  can be taken to be 6);
 There are infinitely many pairs of integers differing by 2, where each of the member of the pair is the product of at most 9 primes;
 Every even number is the sum of two numbers each of which is the product of at most 9 primes.

The last two results were superseded by Chen's theorem, and the second by Goldbach's weak conjecture.

References
 
  
 
 
 
 .

Sieve theory